Southland Park is a neighborhood in Louisville, Kentucky, United States.  Its boundaries are Southside Drive to the west, the Greater Louisville Technology Park (formerly Naval Ordnance) to the north, the CSX railroad tracks to the east, and the pre-merger Louisville city limits to the south.

References

External links
Street map of Southland Park
   Images of Southland Park (Louisville, Ky.) in the University of Louisville Libraries Digital Collections

Neighborhoods in Louisville, Kentucky